The Vaghat people are an ethnic group who traditionally inhabited just over a dozen villages in the hills of Tafawa Balewa and Bogoro LGAs in southwestern Bauchi State, Nigeria. Today, the Vaghat have also moved to many towns and settlements spread across Bauchi State, Plateau State, and Kaduna State (mostly near Zaria). They speak the Vaghat language, one of the Tarokoid languages with over 20,000 speakers.

Clans
Vaghat highland clans are: Āyàlàs, Àyìtūr, Àtòròk, Āyīpàɣí, Āyīgònì, Àyàkdàl, Àyánàvēr, Āyàtōl, Àyàʒíkʔìn, Àyìʤìlìŋ, Áyàshàlà, and Àzàrā.

Vaghat lowland clans are: Āyàlàs, Àyàkdàl, Àyàʒíkʔìn, Àyàgwàr, and Àyàgyēr.

Religion
Traditional Vaghat religion consists of belief in:
Vi Matur, the universal deity (literally 'sun above')
Àdàmōrā, the ancestors
Reincarnation, tya mi karam
Spirits, woni

The Vaghat people also have shrines, called gataŋ mishiri.

Society
In Vaghat traditional society, positions of authority are:

ru ma daghal - secular chief
da mishiri (suŋgwari) - chief priest
maaji (da ma ayokon) - deputy to the chief
maɗaki - advisor to the chief
turaki - advisor to the chief
igomor - chief of the warriors
fan shen (faye ma apal) - chief seer

Burials
The Vaghat people have a cave in a mountain where they keep the skulls of their ancestors.

References

Ethnic groups in Nigeria
Bauchi State